The WWA World Minis Championship is a professional wrestling championship promoted by the Mexican Lucha libre wrestling-based promotion the World Wrestling Association (WWA). The championship is exclusively competed for in the Mini-Estrellas, or Minis, division. A "Mini" is not necessarily a person with dwarfism, as in North American Midget wrestling; it can also be very short wrestlers who work in the Mini-Estrellas division. The championship was created at some point before May 5, 2000 where Piratita Morgan successfully defended it against Octagoncito, but the actual creation date, or how Piratita Morgan became champion has not been documented.

As it was a professional wrestling championship, the championship was not won not by actual competition, but by a scripted ending to a match determined by the bookers and match makers. On occasion the promotion declares a championship vacant, which means there is no champion at that point in time. This can either be due to a storyline, or real life issues such as a champion suffering an injury being unable to defend the championship, or leaving the company.

Title history

Reigns by combined length
Key

See also
Midgets' World Championship
AAA World Mini-Estrella Championship
CMLL World Mini-Estrella Championship
Mexican National Mini-Estrella Championship

Footnotes

References

World Wrestling Association (Mexico) Championships
Midget wrestling championships
World professional wrestling championships